Nestor Johannes "Nestori" Kaasalainen (14 February 1915 – 1 March 2016) was a Finnish politician who served twice as Finland's Minister of Agriculture, whose active career spanned the 1950s and 1960s. He was elected from his home town of Tyrvää (later Vammala, the six rural union (later Keskustan) parliamentary district, he represented the northern election of Turku county. After his career as a member of parliament, he moved from 1972 to 1980 as an administrative director and member of the board of directors at Alko. 

Kaasalainen died in Sipoo on 1 March 2016 at the age of 101.

References

1915 births
2016 deaths
People from Priozersky District
People from Viipuri Province (Grand Duchy of Finland)
Centre Party (Finland) politicians
Ministers of Agriculture of Finland
Members of the Parliament of Finland (1951–54)
Members of the Parliament of Finland (1954–58)
Members of the Parliament of Finland (1958–62)
Members of the Parliament of Finland (1962–66)
Members of the Parliament of Finland (1966–70)
Members of the Parliament of Finland (1970–72)
Finnish centenarians
Men centenarians